Andrésy is a commune in the Yvelines department in north-central France.

Population

Twin towns – sister cities

Andrésy is twinned with:
 Haren, Germany
 Międzyrzecz, Poland
 Oundle, England, United Kingdom
 Westerwolde, Netherlands

See also
Communes of the Yvelines department

References

Communes of Yvelines